Charles S. Ogletree (born October 11, 1967 in Greenville, North Carolina) is an American competitive sailor, collegiate All-American, four-time Olympian, and Olympic silver medalist.

Career
Ogletree has competed in the 1996 Summer Olympics, 2000 Summer Olympics, 2004 Summer Olympics, and the 2008 Summer Olympics.  At the 2004 Summer Olympics in Athens, Ogletree, along with his partner John Lovell, won a silver medal in the tornado class. Coincidentally, He shares the same exact birthday as John Lovell.  Ogletree attended Tabor Academy preparatory school and graduated from Old Dominion University in 1989 with a BA of English.  At Old Dominion University, Ogletree was an All-American and a key part of what is considered one of the best college sailing teams in history.

References

External links
 
 
 
 
 

1967 births
Living people
American male sailors (sport)
China Team sailors
Medalists at the 2004 Summer Olympics
Old Dominion Monarchs sailors
Olympic silver medalists for the United States in sailing
Sportspeople from Greenville, North Carolina
Sailors at the 1996 Summer Olympics – Tornado
Sailors at the 2000 Summer Olympics – Tornado
Sailors at the 2004 Summer Olympics – Tornado
Sailors at the 2008 Summer Olympics – Tornado
Extreme Sailing Series sailors
Tabor Academy (Massachusetts) alumni